<noinclude>

Oaxaca is a state in Southwest Mexico that is divided into 570 municipalities, more than any other state in Mexico. According to Article 113 of the state's constitution, the municipalities are grouped into 30 judicial and tax districts to facilitate the distribution of the state's revenues. It is the only state in Mexico with this particular judicial and tax district organization. Oaxaca is the tenth most populated state with  inhabitants as of the 2020 Mexican census and the fifth largest by land area spanning .

Municipalities in Oaxaca have some administrative autonomy from the state according to the 115th article of the 1917 Constitution of Mexico. Every three years, citizens elect a municipal president by a plurality voting system who heads a concurrently elected municipal council responsible for providing all the public services for their constituents. The municipal council consists of a variable number of trustees and councillors. Municipalities are responsible for public services (such as water and sewerage), street lighting, public safety, traffic, and the maintenance of public parks, gardens and cemeteries. They may also assist the state and federal governments in education, emergency fire and medical services, environmental protection and maintenance of monuments and historical landmarks. Since 1984, they have had the power to collect property taxes and user fees, although more funds are obtained from the state and federal governments than from their own income.

The largest municipality by population as of the 2020 Mexican census is Oaxaca City, with 270,955 residents (6.55% of the state's total), while the smallest is Santa Magdalena Jicotlán with 81 residents, the least populated municipality in Mexico. The newest municipality is Chahuites, established in 1949.

Municipalities

Notes

References

 
Oaxaca